The American Book Award is an American literary award that annually recognizes a set of books and people for "outstanding literary achievement". According to the 2010 awards press release, it is "a writers' award given by other writers" and "there are no categories, no nominees, and therefore no losers."

The Award is administered by the multi-cultural focused nonprofit Before Columbus Foundation, which established it in 1978 and inaugurated it in 1980. The Award honors excellence in American literature without restriction to race, sex, ethnic background, or genre. Previous winners include novelists, social scientists, poets, and historians such as Toni Morrison, Edward Said, Isabel Allende, bell hooks, Don DeLillo, Derrick Bell, Robin D. G. Kelley, Joy Harjo and Tommy J. Curry.

National Book Awards
In 1980, the unrelated National Book Awards was renamed American Book Awards. In 1987 it was renamed back to National Book Awards. Other than having the same name during this seven-year period, the two awards have no relation.

Recipients

1980 to 1989

1980

 Douglas Woolf for Future Preconditional: A Collection
 Edward Dorn for Hello, La Jolla
 Jayne Cortez for Mouth on Paper
 Leslie Marmon Silko for Ceremony
 Mei-mei Berssenbrugge for Random Possession
 Milton Murayama for All I Asking for Is My Body
 Quincy Troupe for Snake Back Solos
 Rudolfo Anaya for Tortuga, a novel

1981

 Alta for Shameless Hussy
 Alan Chong Lau for Songs for Jadina
 Bienvenido N. Santos for Scent of Apples: A Collection of Stories
 Helen Adam for Turn Again to Me & Other Poems
 Lionel Mitchell for Traveling Light
 Miguel Algarín for On Call
 Nicholasa Mohr for Felita
 Peter Blue Cloud for Back Then Tomorrow
 Robert Kelly for The Time of Voice: Poems 1994–1996
 Rose Drachler for The Choice
 Susan Howe for The Liberties
 Toni Cade Bambara for The Salt Eaters

1982

 Al Young for Bodies and Soul
 Duane Niatum for Songs for the Harvester of Dreams: Poems
 E. L. Mayo for Collected Poems E L Mayo
 Frank Chin for The Chickencoop Chinaman and The Year of the Dragon
 Hilton Obenzinger for This Passover or the next, I will never be in Jerusalem
 Him Mark Lai, Genny Lim, Judy Yung for Island: Poetry and History of Chinese Immigrants on Angel Island, 1910–1940
 Jerome Rothenberg for Pre-Faces and Other Writings
 Joyce Carol Thomas for Marked by Fire
 Leroy Quintana for Paper Dance: 55 Latino Poets
 Lorna Dee Cervantes for Emplumada
 Ronald Phillip Tanaka for The Shino Suite: Japanese-American Poetry
 Russell Banks for Book of Jamaica
 Tato Laviera for Enclave

1983

 Barbara Christian for Black Women Novelists: The Development of a Tradition, 1892–1976
 Cecilia Liang for Chinese Folk Poetry
 Evangelina Vigil-Piñón for Thirty: An' Seen a Lot
 Harriet Rohmer for Legend of Food Mountain: LA Montana Del Alimento
 James D. Houston for Californians: Searching for the Golden State
 Jessica Tarahata Hagedorn for Pet food & tropical apparitions
 John A. Williams for Click Song, a novel
 Joy Kogawa for Obasan
 Judy Grahn for The Queen of Wands: Poetry
 Nash Candelaria for Not by the Sword
 Peter Guralnick for Lost Highway: Journeys and Arrivals of American Musicians
 Seán Ó Tuama for An Duanaire Sixteen Hundred to Nineteen Hundred: Poems of the Dispossessed

1984

 Cecil Brown for Days Without Weather
 Gary Snyder for Axe Handles: Poems
 Howard Schwartz, Mark Podwal for The Captive Soul of the Messiah: New Tales About Reb Nachman
 Imamu Amiri Baraka for Anthology of African American Women: Confirmation Men
 Jesús Colón for A Puerto Rican in New York, and Other Sketches
 Joseph Bruchac for Breaking Silence: An Anthology of Contemporary Asian-American Poets
 Maurice Kenny for The Mama Poems
 Mei-mei Berssenbrugge for The heat bird
 Miné Okubo for Citizen 13660
 Paule Marshall for Praisesong for the Widow
 Ruthanne Lum McCunn, You-shan Tang, Ellen Lai-shan Yeung for Pie-Biter
 Thomas McGrath for Echoes inside the labyrinth
 Venkatesh Kulkarni for Naked in Deccan
 William J. Kennedy for O Albany!

1985

 Angela Jackson for Solo in the Box Car Third Floor E
 Arnold Genthe, John Kuo Wei Tchen for Genthe's Photographs of San Francisco's Old Chinatown
 Colleen J. McElroy for Queen of the Ebony Isles
 Gary Soto for Living Up The Street
 Peter Irons for Justice at War
 Keiho Soga, Taisanboku Mori, Sojin Takei, Muin Ozaki for Poets Behind Barbed Wire
 Louise Erdrich for Love Medicine, a novel
 Maureen Owen for Amelia Earhart
 May Sarton for At Seventy: A Journal
 Robert Edward Duncan for Ground Work: Before the War
 Ron Jones for Say Ray
 Sandra Cisneros for The House on Mango Street
 Sonia Sanchez for Homegirls and Handgrenades
 Julia Vinograd for The Book of Jerusalem
 William Oandasan for Round Valley Songs

1986

 Anna Lee Walters for The Sun Is Not Merciful: Short Stories
 Cherríe Moraga, Gloria Anzaldúa for This Bridge Called My Back: Writings by Radical Women of Color
 Helen Barolini for The Dream Book: An Anthology of Writing by Italian American Women
 Jeff Hannusch for I Hear You Knockin : The Sound of New Orleans Rhythm and Blues
 Linda Hogan for Seeing Through the Sun
 Miguel Algarín for Time's Now/Ya Es Tiempo
 Natasha Borovsky for A Daughter of the Nobility
 Raymond Federman for Smiles on Washington Square: A Love Story of Sorts
 Susan Howe for My Emily Dickinson
 Terence Winch for Irish Musicians/American Friends
 Toshio Mori for Yokohama, California

1987

 Ai for SIN
 Ana Castillo for The Mixquiahuala Letters
 Cyn Zarco for Circumnavigations
 Daniel McGuire for Portrait of Little Boy in darkness
 Dorothy Bryant for Confessions of Madame Psyche: Memoirs and Letters of Mei-Li Murrow
 Etheridge Knight for The Essential Etheridge Knight
 Gary Giddins for Celebrating Bird: The Triumph Of Charlie Parker
 Harvey Pekar for The New American Splendor Anthology: From Off the Streets of Cleveland
 James Welch for Fools Crow
 John Wieners for Selected Poems: 1958–1984
 Juan Felipe Herrera for Face Games
 Lucia Chiavola Birnbaum for liberazione della donna: feminism in Italy
 Michael Mayo for Practicing Angels: A Contemporary Anthology of San Francisco Bay Area Poetry
 Septima Poinsette Clark, Cynthia Stokes Brown for Ready from Within: A First Person Narrative
 Terry McMillan for Mama

1988

 Allison Blakely for Russia and the Negro: Blacks in Russian History and Thought
 Charles Olson for The Collected Poems of Charles Olson: Excluding the Maximus Poems
 Daisy Bates for The Long Shadow of Little Rock: A Memoir
 David Halberstam for The Reckoning
 Edward Sanders for Thirsting for Peace in a Raging Century: Poems 1961–1985
 Gerald Vizenor for Griever: An American Monkey King in China
 Jimmy Santiago Baca for Martin & Meditations on the South Valley
 Kesho Y. Scott, Cherry Muhanji, Egyirba High for Tight Spaces
 Marlon K. Hom for Songs of Gold Mountain: Cantonese Rhymes from San Francisco Chinatown
 Benjamin Hoff for The Singing Creek Where the Willows Grow: The Mystical Nature Diary of Opal Whiteley
 Ronald Sukenick for Down and in: Life in the Underground
 Salvatore La Puma for The Boys of Bensonhurst
 Toni Morrison for Beloved
 Wing Tek Lum, Tek Lum Lum for Expounding the Doubtful Points

1989

 Alma Luz Villanueva for The Ultraviolet Sky
 Askia M. Touré for From the Pyramids to the Projects: Poems of Genocide and Resistance!
 Audre Lorde for A Burst of Light
 Carolyn Lau for Wode Shuofa: My Way of Speaking
 Emory Elliott for Columbia Literary History of the United States
 Eduardo Galeano for Genesis
 Frank Chin for The Chinaman Pacific and Frisco R.R. Co.
 Henry Louis Gates for The Signifying Monkey: A Theory of Afro-American Literary Criticism
 Isabel Allende for Eva Luna
 J. California Cooper for Homemade Love
 Jennifer Stone for Stone's Throw
 Josephine Gattuso Hendin for The Right Thing to Do
 Leslie Scalapino for way
 Shuntaro Tanikawa for Floating the River in Melancholy
 Charles Fanning for The Exiles of Erin: Nineteenth-Century Irish-American Fiction
 William Minoru Hohri for Repairing America: An Account of the Movement for Japanese American Redress

1990 to 1999

1990

 Adrienne Kennedy for People Who Led to My Plays
 Barbara Grizzuti Harrison for Italian Days
 Daniela Gioseffi for Women on War (Essential Voices for the Nuclear Age)
 Elizabeth Woody for Hand into Stone: Poems
 Hualing Nieh for Mulberry and Peach: Two Women of China
 Itabari Njeri for Every Good-Bye Ain't Gone
 James M. Freeman for Hearts of Sorrow: Vietnamese-American Lives
 John C. Walter, J. Raymond Jones for The Harlem Fox: J. Raymond Jones and Tammany, 1920–1970
 John Norton for Light at the End of the Bog
 José Emilio González for Vivar a Hostos
 Sergei Kan for Symbolic Immortality: The Tlingit Potlatch of the Nineteenth Century
 Lloyd A. Thompson for Romans and Blacks
 Martin Bernal for Black Athena: The Afroasiatic Roots of Classical Civilization
 Michelle T. Clinton, Sesshu Foster for Invocation L.A.: Urban Multicultural Poetry
 Miles Davis for Miles: The Autobiography
 Paula Gunn Allen for Spider Woman's Granddaughters: Traditional Tales and Contemporary Writing by Native American Women
 Shirley Geok-lin Lim, Mayumi Tsutakawa, Margarita Donnelly for The Forbidden Stitch: An Asian American Women's Anthology

1991

 Alejandro Murguía for Southern Front
 bell hooks for Yearning: Race, Gender, and Cultural Politics
 Bruce Wright for Black Robes, White Justice: Why Our Legal System Doesn't Work for Blacks
 Charley Trujillo for Soldados: Chicanos in Viet Nam
 D. H. Melhem for Heroism in the New Black Poetry: Introductions & Interviews
 Deborah Keenan for Looking for Home: Women Writing About Exile
 Jessica Hagedorn for Dogeaters
 John Edgar Wideman for Philadelphia Fire, a novel
 Joy Harjo for In Mad Love and War
 Karen Tei Yamashita for Through the Arc of the Rain Forest
 Lucia Berlin for Homesick: New and Selected Stories
 Mary Crow Dog for Lakota Woman
 Meridel Le Sueur for Harvest Song: Collected Essays and Stories
 Mill Hunk Herald Collective for Overtime: Punchin' Out With the Mill Hunk Herald Magazine
 Nora Marks Dauenhauer, Richard Dauenhauer for Haa Tuwunaagu Yis, for Healing Our Spirit: Tlingit Oratory
 R. Baxter Miller for The Art and Imagination of Langston Hughes
 Thomas Centolella for Terra Firma

1992

 A'Lelia Perry Bundles for Madam C.J. Walker
 Art Spiegelman for The Complete Maus: A Survivor's Tale
 Benjamin Alire Sáenz for Calendar of Dust
 Donna J. Haraway for Simians, Cyborgs, and Women: The Reinvention of Nature
 Fritjof Capra for Belonging to the universe: Explorations on the frontiers of science and spirituality
 José Antonio Burciaga for Undocumented Love/Amor Indocumentado: A Personal Anthology of Poetry
 Keith Gilyard for Voices of the Self: A Study of Language Competence
 Lucy Thompson for To the American Indian: Reminiscences of a Yurok Woman
 Norma Field for In the Realm of a Dying Emperor: Japan at Century's End
 Peter Bacho for Cebu
 Peter Kalifornsky for Dena'ina Legacy: K'tl'egh'i Sukdu: The Collected Writings of Peter Kalifornsky
 Raymond Andrews for Jessie and Jesus and Cousin Claire
 Sandra Scofield for Beyond Deserving
 Sheila Hamanaka for Journey
 Stephen R. Fox for The Unknown Internment: An Oral History of the Relocation of Italian Americans During World War II
 Steven R. Carter for Hansberry's Drama: Commitment Amid Complexity,
 Verlyn Klinkenborg for The Last Fine Time
 William B. Branch, Amiri Baraka, August Wilson for Black Thunder: An Anthology of African-American Drama

1993

 Asake Bomani, Belvie Rooks for Paris Connections: African American Artists in Paris
 Christopher Mogil, Peter Woodrow for We Gave Away a Fortune
 Cornel West for Prophetic Thought in Postmodern Times
 Denise Giardina for Unquiet Earth
 Diane Glancy for Claiming Breath
 Eugene B. Redmond for The Eye in the Ceiling
 Francisco X. Alarcón for Snake Poems
 Gerald Graff for Beyond the Culture Wars: How Teaching the Conflicts Can Revitalize American Education
 Jack Beatty for The Rascal King: The Life and Times of James Michael Curley
 Leroy V. Quintana for The History of Home
 Katherine Peter for Neets'aii Gwiindaii: Living in the Chandalar Country
 Nelson George for Elevating the Game: Black Men and Basketball
 Ninotchka Rosca for Twice Blessed, a novel

1994

 Giose Rimanelli for Benedetta in Guysterland
 Eric Drooker for Flood!: A Novel in Pictures
 Graciela Limón for In Search of Bernabe
 Gregory J. Reed for Economic Empowerment Through the Church
 Janet Campbell Hale for Bloodlines: Odyssey of a Native Daughter
 Jill Nelson for Volunteer Slavery: My Authentic Negro Experience
 Lawson Fusao Inada for Legends from Camp
 Nicole Blackman for Aloud: Voices from the Nuyorican Poets Cafe
 Paul Gilroy for The Black Atlantic: Modernity and Double-Consciousness
 Ronald Takaki for A Different Mirror: A History of Multicultural America
 Rose L. Glickman for Daughters of Feminists
 Tino Villanueva for Scene from the Movie GIANT
 Virginia L. Kroll for Wood-Hoopoe Willie

1995

 Abraham Rodriguez for Spidertown, a novel
 Herb Boyd, Robert L. Allen for Brotherman: The Odyssey of Black Men in America—An Anthology
 Denise Chávez for Face of an Angel
 John Egerton for Speak Now Against the Day: The Generation Before the Civil Rights Movement in the South
 John Ross for Rebellion from the Roots: Indian Uprising in Chiapas
 Thomas Avena for Life Sentences: Writers, Artists, and AIDS
 Linda Raymond for Rocking the Babies, a novel
 Li-Young Lee for The Winged Seed: A Remembrance
 Marianna De Marco Torgovnick for Crossing Ocean Parkway
 Marnie Mueller for Green Fires: Assault on Eden: A Novel of the Ecuadorian Rainforest
 Peter Quinn for Banished Children of Eve, A Novel of Civil War New York
 Sandra Martz for I Am Becoming the Woman I've Wanted
 Gordon Henry Jr. for The Light People
 Tricia Rose for Black Noise: Rap Music and Black Culture in Contemporary America

1996

 Agate Nesaule for A Woman in Amber: Healing the Trauma of War and Exile
 Arthur Sze for Archipelago
 Chang-Rae Lee for Native Speaker
 Chitra Banerjee Divakaruni for Arranged Marriage
 E. J. Miller Laino for Girl Hurt
 Glenn C. Loury for One by One from the Inside Out: Race and Responsibility in America
 James W. Loewen for Lies My Teacher Told Me: Everything Your American History Textbook Got Wrong
 Joe Sacco, Edward Said for Palestine
 Kimiko Hahn for The Unbearable Heart
 Maria Espinosa for Longing
 Robert Viscusi for Astoria
 Sherman Alexie for Reservation Blues
 Ron Sakolsky, Fred Weihan Ho for Sounding Off!: Music as Resistance / Rebellion / Revolution
 Stephanie Cowell for The Physician of London: The Second Part of the Seventeenth-Century Trilogy of Nicholas Cooke
 William H. Gass for The Tunnel

1997

 Alurista for Et Tu ... Raza
 Derrick Bell for Gospel Choirs: Psalms Of Survival In An Alien Land Called Home
 Dorothy Barresi for The Post-Rapture Diner
 Guillermo Gómez-Peña for The New World Border: Prophecies, Poems, and Loqueras for the End of the Century
 Louis Owens for Nightland
 Martín Espada for Imagine the Angels of Bread: Poems
 Montserrat Fontes for Dreams of the Centaur, a novel
 Noel Ignatiev for Race Traitor
 Shirley Geok-lin Lim for Among the White Moon Faces: An Asian-American Memoir of Homelands
 Sunaina Maira for Contours of the Heart: South Asians Map North America
 Thulani Davis for Maker of Saints
 Tom De Haven for Derby Dugan's Depression Funnies, a novel
 William M. Banks for Black Intellectuals: Race and Responsibility in American Life
 Brenda Knight for Women of the Beat Generation: The Writers, Artists and Muses at the Heart of a Revolution

1998

 Allison Adelle Hedge Coke for Dog Road Woman
 Angela Y. Davis for Blues Legacies and Black Feminism: Gertrude "Ma" Rainey, Bessie Smith, and Billie Holiday
 Brenda Marie Osbey for All Saints: New and Selected Poems
 Don DeLillo for Underworld
 Jim Barnes for On Native Ground: Memoirs and Impressions
 John A. Williams for Safari West: Poems
 Nancy Rawles for Love Like Gumbo
 Nora Okja Keller for Comfort Woman
 Sandra Benitez for Bitter Grounds, a novel
 Scott DeVeaux for The Birth of Bebop: A Social and Musical History
 Thomas Lynch for The Undertaking: Life Studies from the Dismal Trade

1999

 Alice McDermott for Charming Billy
 Anna Linzer for Ghost Dancing
 Brian Ward for Just My Soul Responding: Rhythm and Blues, Black Consciousness, and Race Relations
 Chiori Santiago for Home to Medicine Mountain
 E. Donald Two-Rivers for Survivor's Medicine: Short Stories
 Edwidge Danticat for The Farming of Bones
 Judith Roche, Meg McHutchison for First Fish, First People: Salmon Tales of the North Pacific Rim
 Gioia Timpanelli for Sometimes the Soul: Two Novellas of Sicily
 Gloria Naylor for The Men of Brewster Place, a novel
 James D. Houston for The Last Paradise
 Jerry Lipka, Gerald V. Mohatt, Ciulistet Group for Transforming the Culture of Schools: Yup¡k Eskimo Examples
 Trey Ellis for Right Here, Right Now
 Josip Novakovich for Salvation and Other Disasters
 Lauro Flores for The Floating Borderlands: Twenty-Five Years of U.S. Hispanic Literature
 Luís Alberto Urrea for Nobody's Son: Notes from an American Life
 Nelson George for Hip Hop America: Hip Hop and the Molding of Black Generation X
 Speer Morgan for The Freshour Cylinders
 Gary Gach for What Book!?: Buddha Poems from Beat to Hiphop
 Chiori Santiago, author, Judith Lowry, illustrator, Home to Medicine Mountain

2000 to 2009

2000
 Esther G. Belin for From the Belly of My Beauty
 Allan J. Ryan for The Trickster Shift: Humour and Irony in Contemporary Native Art
 Andrés Montoya for The Ice Worker Sings and Other Poems
 Camille Peri, Kate Moses for Mothers Who Think: Tales of Real-Life Parenthood
 David A. J. Richards for Italian American: The Racializing of an Ethnic Identity
 David Toop for Exotica
 Elva Trevino Hart for Barefoot Heart: Stories of a Migrant Child
 Emil Guillermo for Amok: Essays from an Asian American Perspective; With an Introduction by Ishmael Reed
 Frank Chin for The Chinaman Pacific & Frisco R.R. Co.
 Helen Thomas for Front Row at the White House : My Life and Times
 Janisse Ray for Ecology of a Cracker Childhood
 John Russell Rickford, Russell John Rickford for Spoken Soul: The Story of Black English
 Leroy TeCube for Year in Nam: A Native American Soldier's Story
 Lois-Ann Yamanaka for Heads By Harry
 Michael Lally for It's Not Nostalgia: Poetry & Prose
 Michael Patrick MacDonald for All Souls: A Family Story from Southie
 Rahna Reiko Rizzuto for Why She Left Us, a novel
 Robert Creeley for The Collected Poems of Robert Creeley, 1975–2005
 Editor/Publisher: Ronald Sukenick
 Jack E. White, Journalism
 Frank Chin, Lifetime Achievement
 Robert Creeley, Lifetime Achievement

2001
 Amanda J. Cobb for Listening to Our Grandmothers' Stories: The Bloomfield Academy for Chickasaw Females, 1852–1949
 Andrea Dworkin for Scapegoat: The Jews, Israel, and Women's Liberation
 Carolyne Wright for Seasons of Mangoes and Brainfire
 Chalmers Johnson for Blowback, Second Edition: The Costs and Consequences of American Empire
 Cheri Register for Packinghouse Daughter: A Memoir
 Chris Ware for Jimmy Corrigan: The Smartest Kid on Earth
 Diana Garcia for When Living Was a Labor Camp
 Elizabeth Nunez for Bruised Hibiscus
 Janet McAdams for Island of Lost Luggage
 Philip Whalen for Overtime: Selected Poems
 Russell Leong for Phoenix Eyes and Other Stories
 Sandra M. Gilbert for Kissing the Bread: New and Selected Poems, 1969–1999
 Ted Joans for Teducation
 Tillie Olsen for Silences
 William S. Penn for Killing Time With Strangers
 Malcolm Margolin, Editor
 Ted Joans, Lifetime Achievement
 Tillie Olsen, Lifetime Achievement
 Philip Whalen Lifetime Achievement

2002
 Aaron A. Abeyta, Colcha
 Susanne Antonetta, The Body Toxic: An Environmental Memoir
 Rilla Askew, Fire in Beulah
 Tananarive Due, The Living Blood
 Gloria Frym, Homeless at Home
 Dana Gioia, Interrogations at Noon
 LeAnne Howe, Shell Shaker
 Alex Kuo, Lipstick and Other Stories
 Michael N. Nagler, Is There No Other Way? The Search for a Nonviolent Future
 Donald Phelps, Reading the Funnies : Looking at Great Cartoonists Throughout the First Half of the 20th Century
 Al Young, The Sound of Dreams Remembered: Poems, 1990–2000
 Jessel Miller, Angels in the Vineyards
 Lerone Bennett, Lifetime Achievement
 Jack Hirschman, Lifetime Achievement

2003 
 Kevin Baker, Paradise Alley
 Debra Magpie Earling, Perma Red
 Daniel Ellsberg, Secrets: A Memoir of Vietnam and the Pentagon Papers
 Rick Heide, ed., Under the Fifth Sun: Latino Literature from California
 Igor Krupnik, Willis Walunga, Vera Metcalf, and Lars Krutak, eds, Akuzilleput Igaqullghet, Our Words Put to Paper: Sourcebook in St. Lawrence Island Yupik Heritage and History
 Alejandro Murguía, This War Called Love: Nine Stories
 Jack Newfield, The Full Rudy: The Man, the Myth, the Mania
 Joseph Papaleo, Italian Stories
 Eric Porter, What Is This Thing Called Jazz?: African American Musicians as Artists, Critics, and Activists
 Jewell Parker Rhodes, Douglass' Women, a novel
 Rachel Simon, Riding the Bus with My Sister: A True Life Journey
 Velma Wallis, Raising Ourselves: A Gwich'in Coming of Age Story from the Yukon River
 Max Rodriguez, QBR: The Black Book Review

2004 
 Diana Abu-Jaber, Crescent, a novel
 David Cole, Enemy Aliens: Double Standards And Constitutional Freedoms In The War On Terrorism
 Charisse Jones and Kumea Shorter-Gooden, Shifting: The Double Lives of Black Women in America
 Kristin Hunter Lattany, Breaking Away
 A. Robert Lee, Multicultural American Literature: Comparative Black, Native, Latino/a and Asian American Fictions
 Diane Sher Lutovich, What I Stole
 Ruth Ozeki, All Over Creation
 Renato Rosaldo, Prayer to Spider Woman / Rezo a la Mujer Arana
 Scott Saul, Freedom Is, Freedom Ain't: Jazz and the Making of the Sixties
 Michael Walsh, And All the Saints

2005 
 Bernard W. Bell, The Contemporary African American Novel: Its Folk Roots And Modern Literary Branches
 Cecelie Berry, Rise Up Singing: Black Women Writers on Motherhood
 Jeff Chang, Can't Stop Won't Stop: A History of the Hip-Hop Generation
 Julie Chibbaro, Redemption
 Richard A. Clarke, Against All Enemies: Inside America's War on Terror
 Alisha S. Drabek and Karen R. Adams, The Red Cedar of Afognak, A Driftwood Journey
 Ralph M. Flores, The Horse in the Kitchen: Stories of a Mexican-American Family
 Hiroshi Kashiwagi, Swimming in the American: A Memoir And Selected Writings
 Robert F. Kennedy, Jr., Crimes Against Nature: How George W. Bush and His Corporate Pals Are Plundering the Country and Hijacking Our Democracy
 Don Lee, Country of Origin, a novel
 Lamont B. Steptoe, A Long Movie of Shadows
 Don West, No Lonesome Road: Selected Prose and Poems, eds Jeff Biggers and George Brosi
 Journalism: Bill Berkowitz

2006
 MacKenzie Bezos, The Testing of Luther Albright, a novel
 Matt Briggs, Shoot the Buffalo
 David P. Diaz, The White Tortilla: Reflections of a Second-Generation Mexican-American
 Darryl Dickson-Carr, The Columbia Guide to Contemporary African American Fiction
 Thomas Ferraro, Feeling Italian: The Art of Ethnicity in America
 Tim Z. Hernandez, Skin Tax
 Josh Kun, Audiotopia: Music, Race, and America
 P. Lewis, Nate
 Peter Metcalfe, Gumboot Determination: The Story of the Southeast Alaska Regional Health Consortium
 Kevin J. Mullen, The Toughest Gang in Town: Police Stories from Old San Francisco
 Doris Seale and Beverly Slapin, eds., A Broken Flute: The Native Experience in Books for Children
 Matthew Shenoda, Somewhere Else
 Carlton T. Spiller, Scalding Heart
 Chris Hamilton-Emery, Editor 
 Jay Wright, Lifetime Achievement

2007
 Daniel Cassidy, How the Irish Invented Slang: The Secret Language of the Crossroads
 Michael Eric Dyson, Come Hell or High Water: Hurricane Katrina and the Color of Disaster
 Rigoberto González, Butterfly Boy: Memories of a Chicano Mariposa
 Reyna Grande, Across a Hundred Mountains, a novel
 Ernestine Hayes, Blonde Indian: An Alaska Native Memoir
 Patricia Klindienst, The Earth Knows My Name: Food, Culture, and Sustainability in the Gardens of Ethnic Americans
 Gary Panter, Jimbo's Inferno
 Jeffrey F. L. Partridge, Beyond Literary Chinatown
 Judith Roche, Wisdom of the Body
 Kali VanBaale, The Space Between

2008
 Moustafa Bayoumi, How Does It Feel to Be a Problem Being Young and Arab in America
 Douglas A. Blackmon, Slavery by Another Name: The Re-Enslavement of Black Americans from the Civil War to World War II
 Jonathan Curiel, Al’ America: Travels Through America's Arab and Islamic Roots
 Nora Marks Dauenhauer, Richard Dauenhauer, and Lydia T. Black. Anóoshi Lingít Aaní Ká. Russians in Tlingit America: The Battles of Sitka, 1802 and 1804
 Maria Mazziotti Gillan, All That Lies Between Us
 Nikki Giovanni, The Collected Poetry of Nikki Giovanni: 1968–1998
 C. S. Giscombe, Prairie Style
 Angela Jackson, Where I Must Go, a novel
 L. Luis Lopez, Each Month I Sing
 Tom Lutz, Doing Nothing: A History of Loafers, Loungers, Slackers, and Bums in America
 Fae Myenne Ng, Steer Toward Rock
 Yuko Taniguchi, The Ocean in the Closet
 Lorenzo Thomas, Don't Deny My Name: Words and Music and the Black Intellectual Tradition, ed. Aldon Lynn Nielsen
 Frank B. Wilderson III, Incognegro: A Memoir of Exile and Apartheid
 J. J. Phillips, Lifetime Achievement

2009
 Houston A. Baker, Jr., Betrayal: How Black Intellectuals Have Abandoned the Ideals of the Civil Right Era
 Danit Brown, Ask for a Convertible
 Jericho Brown, Please
 José Antonio Burciaga, The Last Supper of Chicano Heroes: Selected Works of José Antonio Burciaga, eds Mimi R. Gladstein and Daniel Chacón
 Claire Hope Cummings, Uncertain Peril: Genetic Engineering and the Future of Seeds
 Stella Pope Duarte, If I Die in Juarez
 Linda Gregg, All of It Singing: New and Selected Poems
 Suheir Hammad, Breaking Poems
 Richard Holmes, The Age of Wonder
 George E. Lewis, A Power Stronger than Itself: The A.A.C.M. and American Experimental Music
 Patricia Santana, Ghosts of El Grullo
 Jack Spicer, My Vocabulary Did This to Me: The Collected Poetry of Jack Spicer, ed. Peter Gizzi and Kevin Killian
 Miguel Algarín, Lifetime Achievement

2010 to 2019

2010
 Amiri Baraka, Digging: The Afro-American Soul of American Classical Music
 Sherwin Bitsui, Flood Song
 Nancy Carnevale, A New Language, A New World: Italian Immigrants in the United States, 1890–1945
 Dave Eggers, Zeitoun
 Sesshu Foster, World Ball Notebook
 Stephen D. Gutierrez, Live from Fresno y Los
 Victor LaValle, The Big Machine
 François Mandeville, This Is What They Say, translated by Ron Scollon from Chipewyan
 Bich Minh Nguyen, Short Girls
 Franklin Rosemont and Robin D. G. Kelley, eds., Black, Brown, & Beige: Surrealist Writings from Africa and the Diaspora
 Jerome Rothenberg and Jeffrey C. Robinson, eds., Poems for the Millennium: Volume Three: The University of California Book of Romantic and Postromantic Poetry
 Kathryn Waddell Takara, Pacific Raven: Hawai`i Poems
 Pamela Uschuk, Crazy Love: New Poems
 Katha Politt, Lifetime Achievement 
 Quincy Troupe, Lifetime Achievement 

2011
 Keith Gilyard, John Oliver Killens
 Akbar Ahmed, Journey Into America: The Challenge of Islam
 Camille Dungy, Suck on the Marrow
 Karen Tei Yamashita, I Hotel
 William W. Cook and James Tatum, African American Writers and Classical Tradition 
 Gerald Vizenor, Shrouds of White Earth
 Eric Gansworth, Extra Indians 
 Ivan Argüelles, The Death of Stalin 
 Geoffrey Alan Argent, ed., The Complete Plays of Jean Racine: Volume 1: The Fratricides, translated by Argent from French
 Neela Vaswani, You Have Given Me a Country 
 Sasha Pimentel Chacón, Insides She Swallowed 
 Miriam Jiménez Román and Juan Flores, eds., The Afro-Latin@ Reader: History of Culture in the United States 
 Carmen Giménez Smith, Bring Down the Little Birds
 Luis Valdez, Lifetime Achievement
 John A. Williams, Lifetime Achievement

2012
 Annia Ciezadlo, Day of Honey: A Memoir of Food, Love, and War
 Arlene Kim, What Have You Done to Our Ears to Make Us Hear Echoes?
 Ed Bok Lee, Whorled
 Adilifu Nama, Super Black: American Pop Culture and Black Superheroes
 Rob Nixon, Slow Violence and the Environmentalism of the Poor
 Shann Ray, American Masculine
 Alice Rearden, translator; Ann Fienup-Riordan, ed., Qaluyaarmiuni Nunamtenek Qanemciput: Our Nelson Island Stories
 Touré, Who's Afraid of Post-Blackness? What It Means to Be Black Now
 Amy Waldman, The Submission 
 Mary Winegarden, The Translator's Sister
 Kevin Young, Ardency: A Chronicle of the Amistad Rebels
 Eugene B. Redmond, Lifetime Achievement

 2013
 Will Alexander, Singing In Magnetic Hoofbeat: Essays, Prose, Texts, Interviews, and a Lecture, Essay Press
 Jacob M. Appel, The Man Who Wouldn't Stand Up, Cargo
 Philip P. Choy, San Francisco Chinatown: A Guide To Its History & Architecture, City Lights
 Amanda Coplin, The Orchardist, Harper Collins
 Natalie Diaz, When My Brother Was An Aztec, Copper Canyon Press
 Louise Erdrich, The Round House, Harper Collins
 Alan Gilbert, Black Patriots and Loyalists: Fighting for Emancipation in the War for Independence, University of Chicago
 Judy Grahn, A Simple Revolution: The Making of an Activist Poet, Aunt Lute Books
 Joy Harjo, Crazy Brave: A Memoir, W.W. Norton & Co.
 Demetria Martinez, The Block Captain's Daughter, University of Oklahoma Press
 Daniel Abdal-Hayy Moore, Blood Songs, The Ecstatic Exchange
 dg nanouk okpik, Corpse Whale, University of Arizona Press
 Seth Rosenfeld, Subversives: The FBI's War On Student Radical and Reagan's Rise to Power, Farrar, Straus & Giroux
 Christopher B. Teuton, Cherokee Stories of the Turtle Island Liar's Club, University of North Carolina
 Lew Welch, Ring of Bone: Collected Poems, City Lights
 Ivan Argüelles, Lifetime Achievement
 Greil Marcus, Lifetime Achievement
 Floyd Salas, Lifetime Achievement

 2014
 Andrew Bacevich, Breach of Trust: How Americans Failed Their Soldiers and Their Country, Metropolitan Books
  Joshua Bloom and Waldo E. Martin, Jr., Black Against Empire; The History and Politics of the Black Panther Party, University of California Press
 Juan Delgado (poetry) and Thomas McGovern (photography), Vital Signs, Heyday Books
 Alex Espinoza, The Five Acts of Diego León, Random House
 Jonathan Scott Holloway, Jim Crow Wisdom: Memory and Identity in Black America Since 1940, University of North Carolina Press
 Joan Naviyuk Kane, Hyperboreal, University of Pittsburgh Press
 Jamaica Kincaid, See Now Then, Farrar, Straus and Giroux
 Tanya Olson, Boyishly, YesYes Books
 Sterling D. Plumpp, Home/Bass, Third World Press
 Emily Raboteau, Searching For Zion: The Quest for Home in the African Diaspora, Atlantic Monthly Press
 Jerome Rothenberg with Heriberto Yepez, Eye of Witness: A Jerome Rothenberg Reader, Commonwealth Books
 Nick Turse, Kill Anything That Moves: The Real American War in Vietnam, Metropolitan Books
 Margaret Wrinkle, Wash, Atlantic Monthly Press
 Koon Woon, Water Chasing Water, Kaya Press
 Armond White, Anti-Censorship Award
 Michael Parenti, Lifetime Achievement

 2015
 Hisham Aidi, Rebel Music: Race, Empire, and the New Muslim Youth Culture (Vintage)
 Arlene Biala, her beckoning hands (Word Poetry)
 Arthur Dong, Forbidden City, USA: Chinese American Nightclubs, 1936-1970 (DeepFocus Productions)
 Roxanne Dunbar-Ortiz, An Indigenous Peoples' History of the United States (Beacon Press)
 Peter J. Harris, The Black Man of Happiness (Black Man of Happiness Project)
 Marlon James, A Brief History of Seven Killings (Riverhead Books)
 Naomi Klein, This Changes Everything: Capitalism vs. The Climate (Simon & Schuster)
 Laila Lalami, The Moor's Account (Pantheon)
 Manuel Luis Martinez, Los Duros (Floricanto Press)
 Craig Santos Perez, from unincorporated territory [guma’] (Omnidawn)
 Carlos Santana with Ashley Kahn and Hal Miller, The Universal Tone: Bringing My Story to Light (Little, Brown and Company)
 Ira Sukrungruang, Southside Buddhist (University of Tampa Press)
 Astra Taylor, The People's Platform: Taking Back Power and Culture in the Digital Age (Henry Holt)
 Anne Waldman, Lifetime Achievement
2016

 Laura Da', Tributaries (University of Arizona)
 Susan Muaddi Darraj, Curious Land: Stories from Home (University of Massachusetts)
 Deepa Iyer, We Too Sing America: South Asian, Arab, Muslim, and Sikh Immigrants Shape Our Multicultural Future (The New Press)
 Mat Johnson, Loving Day (Spiegel & Grau)
 John Keene, Counternarratives (New Directions)
 William J. Maxwell, F.B. Eyes: How J. Edgar Hoover's Ghostreaders Framed African American Literature (Princeton University)
 Lauret Savoy, Trace: Memory, History, Race, and the American Landscape (Counterpoint)
 Ned Sublette and Constance Sublette, The American Slave Coast: A History of the Slave-Breeding Industry (Lawrence Hill Books)
 Jesús Salvador Treviño, Return to Arroyo Grande (Arte Público)
 Nick Turse, Tomorrow's Battlefield: U.S. Proxy Wars and Secret Ops in Africa (Haymarket Books)
 Ray Young Bear, Manifestation Wolverine: The Collected Poetry of Ray Young Bear (Open Road Integrated Media)
 Louise Meriwether, Lifetime Achievement
 Lyra Monteiro and Nancy Isenberg, Walter & Lillian Lowenfels Criticism Award
 Chiitaanibah Johnson, Andrew Hope Award
2017

 Rabia Chaudry Adnan's Story: The Search for Truth and Justice After Serial (St. Martin's Press)
 Flores A. Forbes Invisible Men: A Contemporary Slave Narrative in the Era of Mass Incarceration (Skyhorse Publishing)
 Yaa Gyasi Homegoing (Knopf)
 Holly Hughes Passings (Expedition Press)
 Randa Jarrar Him, Me, Muhammad Ali (Sarabande Books)
 Bernice L. McFadden The Book of Harlan (Akashic Books)
 Brian D. McInnes Sounding Thunder: The Stories of Francis Pegahmagabow (Michigan State University Press)
 Patrick Phillips Blood at the Root: A Racial Cleansing in America (W. W. Norton & Company)
 Vaughn Rasberry Race and the Totalitarian Century: Geopolitics in the Black Literary Imagination (Harvard University Press)
 Marc Anthony Richardson Year of the Rat (Fiction Collective Two)
 Shawna Yang Ryan Green Island (Knopf)
 Ruth Sergel See You in the Streets: Art, Action, and Remembering the Triangle Shirtwaist Factory Fire (University of Iowa Press)
 Solmaz Sharif Look (Graywolf Press)
 Adam Soldofsky Memory Foam (Disorder Press)
 Alfredo Véa The Mexican Flyboy (University of Oklahoma Press)
 Dean Wong Seeing the Light: Four Decades in Chinatown (Chin Music Press)
 Nancy Mercado  Lifetime Achievement
 Ammiel Alcalay Editor/Publisher Award: Lost & Found: The CUNY Poetics Document Initiative
2018 

 Thi Bui The Best We Could Do: An Illustrated Memoir (Harry N. Abrams)
 Rachelle Cruz God's Will for Monsters (Inlandia Books)
 Tommy Curry The Man-Not: Race, Class, Genre, and the Dilemmas of Black Manhood (Temple University Press)
 Tongo Eisen-Martin Heaven Is All Goodbyes (City Lights)
 Dana Naone Hall Life of the Land: Articulations of a Native Writer (University of Hawaii)
 Kelly Lytle Hernández City of Inmates: Conquest, Rebellion, and the Rise of Human Caging in Los Angeles, 1771-1965 (University of North Carolina)
 Victor LaValle The Changeling: A Novel (Spiegel & Grau)
 Bojan Louis Currents (BkMk Press)
 Valeria Luiselli Tell Me How It Ends: An Essay in Forty Questions (Coffee House Press)
 Cathryn Josefina Merla-Watson and B. V. Olguín Altermundos Latin@ Speculative Literature, Film, and Popular Culture (UCLA Chicano Studies Research Center Press)
 Tiya Miles The Dawn of Detroit: A Chronicle of Slavery and Freedom in the City of the Straits (The New Press)
 Tommy Pico Nature Poem (Tin House Books)
 Rena Priest Patriarchy Blues (MoonPath Press)
 Joseph Rios Shadowboxing: poems & impersonations (Omnidawn)
 Sunaura Taylor Beasts of Burden: Animal and Disability Liberation (The New Press)
 Sequoyah Guess Lifetime Achievement
 Kellie Jones South of Pico: African American Artists in Los Angeles in the 1960s and 1970s (Duke University Press): Walter & Lillian Lowenfels Criticism Award
 Charles F. Harris Editor/Publisher Award
 Rob Rogers Anti-Censorship Award
 Heroes Are Gang Leaders Oral Literature Award
2019 

 Frank Abe, Greg Robinson, and Floyd Cheung John Okada: The Life & Rediscovered Work of the Author of No-No Boy (University of Washington Press)
 May-lee Chai Useful Phrases for Immigrants: Stories (Blair)
 Louise DeSalvo The House of Early Sorrows: A Memoir in Essays (Fordham University Press)
 Heid E. Erdrich New Poets of Native Nations (Graywolf Press)
 Ángel García Teeth Never Sleep: Poems (University of Arkansas Press)
 Tommy Orange There There (Knopf)
 Halifu Osumare Dancing in Blackness: A Memoir (University Press of Florida)
 Christopher Patton Unlikeness Is Us: Fourteen from the Exeter Book (Gaspereau Press)
 Mark Sarvas Memento Park: A Novel (Farrar, Straus and Giroux)
 Jeffrey C. Stewart The New Negro: The Life of Alain Locke (Oxford University Press)
 William T. Vollmann Carbon Ideologies: Volume I, No Immediate Danger, Volume II, No Good Alternative (Viking Press|Viking)
 G. Willow Wilson and Nico Leon Ms. Marvel Vol. 9: Teenage Wasteland (Marvel Comics)
 Nathan Hare Lifetime Achievement Award
 UCLA Chicano Studies Research Center Editor/Publisher Award
 Moor Mother Oral Literature Award

2020 to present

2020

 Reginald Dwayne Betts, Felon: Poems (W.W. Norton) 
 Sara Borjas, Heart Like a Window, Mouth Like a Cliff (Noemi Press)
 Neeli Cherkovski, Raymond Foye, Tate Swindell, editors, Collected Poems of Bob Kaufman (City Lights) 
 Staceyann Chin, Crossfire: A Litany for Survival (Haymarket) 
 Kali Fajardo-Anstine, Sabrina & Corina: Stories (One World) 
 Tara Fickle, The Race Card: From Gaming Technologies to Model Minorities (New York University Press) 
 Erika Lee, America for Americans: A History of Xenophobia in the United States (Basic Books) 
 Yoko Ogawa, The Memory Police (Pantheon) 
 Jake Skeets, Eyes Bottle Dark with a Mouthful of Flowers (Milkweed Editions) 
 George Takei, Justin Eisinger, Steven Scott, and Harmony Becker, They Called Us Enemy (Top Shelf Productions) 
 Ocean Vuong, On Earth We're Briefly Gorgeous (Penguin) 
 De'Shawn Charles Winslow, In West Mills (Bloomsbury Publishing) 
 Albert Woodfox with Leslie George, Solitary: My Story of Transformation and Hope (Grove Press) 
 Lifetime Achievement: Eleanor W. Traylor 
 Editor Award: The Panopticon Review, Kofi Natambu, editor
 Publisher Award: Commune Editions, Jasper Bernes, Joshua Clover, and Juliana Spahr, editors
 Oral Literature Award: Amalia Leticia Ortiz
 Walter & Lillian Lowenfels Criticism Award: Appalachian Reckoning: A Region Responds to Hillbilly Elegy, edited by Anthony Harkins and Meredith McCarroll

2021

 Ayad Akhtar, Homeland Elegies (Little, Brown & Co.) 
 Maisy Card, These Ghosts Are Family (Simon & Schuster)
 Anthony Cody, Borderland Apocrypha (Omnidawn Press)
 Ben Ehrenreich, Desert Notebooks: A Road Map for the End of Time (Counterpoint)
 Johanna Fernández, The Young Lords: A Radical History (University of North Carolina Press)
 Carolyn Forché, In the Lateness of the World: Poems (Penguin Press)
 John Giorno, Great Demon Kings: A Memoir of Poetry, Sex, Art, Death, and Enlightenment (Farrar, Straus and Giroux)
 Cathy Park Hong, Minor Feelings: An Asian American Reckoning (One World)
 Randall Horton, {#289-128}: Poems (University of Kentucky)
 Gerald Horne, The Dawning of the Apocalypse: The Roots of Slavery, White Supremacy, Settler Colonialism, and Capitalism in the Long Sixteenth Century (Monthly Review Press)
 Robert P. Jones, White Too Long: The Legacy of White Supremacy in American Christianity (Simon & Schuster)
 Judy Juanita, Manhattan my ass, you’re in Oakland (Equidistance Press)
 William Melvin Kelley (author), Aiki Kelley (illustrator), Dunfords Travels Everywheres (Anchor Books)
 Lifetime Achievement: Maryemma Graham
 Walter & Lillian Lowenfels Criticism Award: Everything Man: The Form and Function of Paul Robeson, by Shana Redmond
 Anti-Censorship Award: Separated: Inside an American Tragedy, by Jacob Soboroff

2022

 Spencer Ackerman, Reign of Terror: How the 9/11 Era Destabilized America and Produced Trump (Viking)
 Esther G. Belin, Jeff Burgland, Connie A. Jacobs, Anthony K. Webster, editors, The Diné Reader: An Anthology of Navajo Literature (University of Arizona Press)
 Emma Brodie, Songs in Ursa Major (Knopf)
 Daphne Brooks, Liner Notes for the Revolution: The Intellectual Life of Black Feminist Sound (Harvard University Press)
 Myriam J. A. Chancy, What Storm, What Thunder (Tin House Books)
 Francisco Goldman, Monkey Boy (Grove Press)
 Zakiya Dalila Harris, The Other Black Girl: A Novel (Atria Books)
 Fatima Shaik, Economy Hall: The Hidden History of a Free Black Brotherhood (The Historic New Orleans Collection)
 Edwin Torres, Quanundrum: [i will be your many angled thing] (Roof Books)
 Truong Tran, Book of the Other: Small in Comparison (Kaya Press)
 Mai Der Vang, Yellow Rain (Graywolf Press)
 Phillip B. Williams, Mutiny (Penguin Books)
 Michelle Zauner, Crying in H Mart: A Memoir (Knopf)
 Lifetime Achievement: Gayl Jones
 Walter & Lillian Lowenfels Criticism Award: Sound Recording Technology and American Literature, by Jessica E. Teague
 Anti-Censorship Award: Jeffrey St. Clair
 Editor/Publisher Award: Wave Books: Charlie Wright (Publisher) / Joshua Beckman (Editor in Chief)

References

 
American literary awards
Awards established in 1978
1978 establishments in the United States